Emmett James Conrad (October 6, 1923 – April 24, 1993) was a surgeon and Dallas civic leader. He was the first African-American member of both the Dallas Independent School District's board of trustees and the Texas State Board of Education.

Early life and education 
Emmett J. Conrad was born in Baton Rouge, Louisiana in 1923 to John and Flora Conrad. After graduating from high school and briefly beginning university studies at Southern University, Conrad was drafted into the United States Army. After serving in the army for a brief period of World War II, Conrad completed his undergraduate studies at Stanford University before enrolling in Meharry Medical College in Nashville, where he was awarded a Doctor of Medicine in 1948.

Career 
After graduating from medical school, Conrad completed a surgical residency at Homer Phillips Hospital in St. Louis, Missouri. In 1955, Conrad relocated to Dallas in order to practice at St. Paul's Hospital.

Prior to the year 1954, Black doctors in Dallas were not able to practice in or join the medical staffs of prominent Dallas hospitals. Black doctors were also excluded from the Texas Medical Association (TMA), which was the only professional organization recognized by the American Medical Association (AMA) in the state of Texas. St. Paul's Hospital was the first white hospital in Dallas to allow Black doctors hospital privileges and staff membership. Conrad became the first Black surgeon on the staff of St. Paul's Hospital in 1956, and would later become the hospital's Chief of Staff.

In addition to his career as a medical doctor, Conrad served as an educational advocate and civic leader in Dallas.  In 1967, Conrad became the first Black member of the Dallas Independent School District (DISD) Board of Trustees. Conrad also served on the Select Committee on Public Education and was appointed by Governor Mark White as the first Black member of the Texas State Board of Education.

During his 10-year tenure on the DISD Board of Trustees, Conrad worked towards initiatives such as the desegregation of school students and administration, the implementation of free lunch programming for low-income students, and the creation of Kindergarten programs in district. As a member of the Texas State Board of Education, Conrad also helped to pass controversial House Bill 72. Commonly known as "No Pass No Play," this policy mandates that students must be passing in all school courses in order to participate in extracurricular activities.

Awards and honors 
In 1993, the Dr. Emmett J. Conrad Leadership Program was established in order to provide the college students in Texas Senatorial District 23 an opportunity to participate in internships and community service that expand their leadership skills.

In 2006, Emmett J. Conrad High School was founded in Dallas, Texas in honor of Conrad.

Personal life 
Conrad married Eleanor Nelson on July 15, 1949. The couple had only one child, Cecilia Conrad, who currently serves as the CEO for Lever for Change, as well as the Managing Director of the John D. and Catherine T. MacArthur Foundation. Emmett J. Conrad died on April 24, 1993 as a result of lung disease.

References 

1923 births
1993 deaths
American surgeons
People from Baton Rouge, Louisiana
Southern University alumni
Stanford University alumni
Meharry Medical College alumni
Dallas Independent School District
School board members in Texas
20th-century American physicians
Physicians from Texas
United States Army personnel of World War II
People from Dallas
20th-century African-American physicians